Euan Henderson (born 30 June 1967) is a retired Scottish professional snooker player.

Career
In his twelve-year professional career he reached only one ranking final, in the 1996 Grand Prix, albeit without beating any of the game's established leading players. His 6–3 semi-final win over the Welsh veteran Mark Bennett (who had knocked out several of the game's big names – including Chris Small, Peter Ebdon, Steve Davis and Tony Drago en route to the semi-final stage) did see him take out that tournament's in-form player. However, Mark Williams proved too strong for Henderson in the final. Henderson took the opening frame and also led 3–2 at one point, but lost 9–5 to Williams. This tournament, besides having two surprise semi-finalists in Henderson and Bennett, made headlines because many of the pre-tournament favourites (including the reigning world champion and world No.1 Stephen Hendry, Alan McManus, Peter Ebdon and Nigel Bond) were all knocked out in the first round.

In the 1994 Grand Prix competition he had his first high-profile victory, beating Jimmy White to reach the last 16.

After retiring from snooker in 2003, Henderson became a police officer.

Performance and rankings timeline

Career finals

Ranking finals: 1

References

External links 
Profile on snooker database

Scottish snooker players
Living people
1967 births